Thomas Kelly Cheyne,  (18 September 18411915) was an English divine and Biblical critic.

Biography
He was born in London and educated at Merchant Taylors' School, London, and Oxford University. Subsequently, he studied German theological methods at Göttingen. He was ordained in 1864 and held a fellowship at Balliol College, Oxford, from 1868 to 1882. During the earlier part of this period he stood alone in the university as a teacher of the main conclusions of Old Testament criticism at that time. In 1881 he was presented to the rectory of Tendring, in Essex, and in 1884 he was made a member of the Old Testament revision company. He resigned the living of Tendring in 1885 on his appointment to be Oriel Professor of the Interpretation of Holy Scripture, which carried with it a canonry at Rochester. In 1889 he delivered the Bampton lectures at Oxford. In 1908 he resigned his professorship.

In June 1901, he received an honorary doctorate of Divinity from the University of Glasgow, and in March 1902 he was awarded the degree Doctor of Letters (D.Litt.) from the University of Oxford.

IN 1882 he married Frances Godfrey. After her death in 1907, he married the poet Elizabeth Gibson in 1911. 

He consistently urged in his writings the necessity of a broad and comprehensive study of the Scriptures in the light of literary, historical and scientific considerations. His publications include commentaries on the Prophets and Hagiographa, as well as lectures and addresses on theological subjects. He was a joint editor of the Encyclopaedia Biblica (London, 1899-1903), a work embodying the more advanced conclusions of English biblical criticism. In the introduction to his Origin of the Psalter (London, 1891) he gave an account of his development as a critical scholar. His publications include translations, commentaries, and supplemental research.

He became a member of the Baháʼí Faith by 1912.
"If there has been any Prophet in recent times," he would write in his 1914 work 'The Reconciliation of Races and Religions', "it is to Bahá'u'lláh that we must go. Character is the final judge. Bahá'u'lláh was a man of the highest class – that of Prophets."

Publications

Books
In his lifetime Cheyne published over a dozen volumes.
The Relations Between Civilized and Uncivilized Races: A Prize Essay Read in the Theatre, Oxford was perhaps his first publication in 1864.
Encyclopaedia Biblica co-edited with J. Sutherland Black in 1903, revised 1907, is still widely cited, even in Wikipedia.
Founders of Old Testament Criticism: Biographical, Descriptive, and Critical Studies - Wipf and Stock  9781592443789
Job and Solomon: Or the Wisdom of the Old Testament - Wipf and Stock  9781597521512
The Mines of Isaiah Re-explored - Wipf and Stock  9781597521550
Introduction to the Book of Isaiah - Wipf and Stock  9781592449095
The Origin and Religious Contents of The Psalter: In the Light of Old Testament Criticism and the History of Religions - Wipf and Stock  9781606082577
Aids to the Devout Study of Criticism: Part I: The David Narrative, Part II: The Book of Psalms - Wipf and Stock  9781606085004
Traditions & Beliefs of Ancient Israel (1907) - Various reprints

Articles
Several articles in the Encyclopædia Britannica, 9th edition (1875–89) and 10th edition (1902-03), including on Circumcision, Deluge and Hittites.

Notes

External links 

 
 
 
New York Times Obituary
Cheyne Family Website - Thomas Kelly Cheyne - family history
THOMAS KELLY CHEYNE (1841-1915), BIBLICAL SCHOLAR AND BAHĀ'Ī by  Stephen N. Lambden  (Ohio University)
Annotated Bibliography by  Stephen N. Lambden  (Ohio University)

1841 births
1915 deaths
Fellows of Oriel College, Oxford
English Bahá'ís
Oriel and Laing Professors of the Interpretation of Holy Scripture
Converts to the Bahá'í Faith from Anglicanism
20th-century Bahá'ís
Thomas Kelly
Biblical criticism
British biblical scholars
Anglican biblical scholars
Fellows of the British Academy